Roger Fuller is an American politician who represented part of Lewiston in the Maine House of Representatives from 2016 to 2018.

In 2018, Fuller announced he would not seek reelection to his seat and endorsed Margaret Craven to succeed him.

References

Living people
Democratic Party members of the Maine House of Representatives
Year of birth missing (living people)